The Rocks is a suburb, tourist precinct and historic area of Sydney's city centre, in the state of New South Wales, Australia. It is located on the southern shore of Sydney Harbour, immediately north-west of the Sydney central business district.

Boundaries
The formal boundaries of the suburb named "The Rocks" cover the western side of Sydney Cove (Circular Quay) east of the Sydney Harbour Bridge approaches. In the north it extends to the southern base of the Sydney Harbour Bridge, in the east to the shoreline of Circular Quay and George Street, in the south to Jamison Street (thus including the area known as "Church Hill"), and in the west to southern approaches of the Sydney Harbour Bridge and the Western Distributor overpass.

History

The Rocks became established shortly after the colony's formation in 1788. It was known as Tallawoladah by the Cadigal people. The original buildings were first traditional vernacular houses, of wattle and daub, with thatched roofs, and later of local sandstone, from which the area derives its name. From the earliest history of the settlement, the area had a reputation as a slum and the arriving convicts' side of town, often frequented by visiting sailors and prostitutes. After November 1790, many of the inhabitants were also aboriginals. In 1823, the district had a population of about 1,200. During the late nineteenth century, the area was dominated by a gang known as the Rocks Push. It maintained this rough reputation until approximately the 1870s.

By the early 20th century, many of the area's historic buildings were in serious decay. In 1900, bubonic plague broke out, and the state government resumed areas around The Rocks and Darling Harbour, with the intention of demolishing them and rebuilding them. More than 3,800 houses, buildings and wharves were inspected and hundreds demolished, but the continuation of these plans were brought to a halt due to the outbreak of World War I. During the 1920s, several hundred buildings were demolished during the construction of the Sydney Harbour Bridge.

Sydney Cove Redevelopment Authority, with the intention of demolishing most of the original buildings, re-developing them as high-density residential dwellings. In February 1971, a group of local residents formed the Rocks Residents Group to oppose the plans. They felt that the new dwellings would result in increased rents, which would force out the traditional residents of the area. The residents' group requested a green ban from the Builder's Labourers Federation, who had become increasingly active in preventing controversial developments over the previous four years.

By 1973, the union had imposed the ban, and after discussions with the Sydney Cove Redevelopment Authority, a 'People's Plan' was developed. By October 1973, it appeared that the redevelopment would proceed as originally planned, using non-union labour. For two weeks, demonstrations by local residents and unionists followed, with numerous arrests being made. Liberal Premier Robert Askin was in the midst of an election campaign, and used the protests as a means of conveying his law and order message to voters. However, the green ban stayed in place until 1975 when the state union leadership was overthrown and was ultimately successful, as can be seen in the buildings that survive today. Instead of demolishing The Rocks, renovations transformed the area into a commercial and tourist precinct.

Today the Rocks is a partly gentrified area, but still contains a significant proportion of Housing Commission properties, and there is still a significant problem of urban poverty and street crime in this district. As housing stock becomes dilapidated, government policy is to sell the now extremely valuable public housing units to private owners, in the expectation that they will restore the properties. The Sirius building and the associated "Save Our Sirius" protest group was formed to protest relocation of its residents.

Church Hill 

"Church Hill" is located in the southern part of The Rocks, sometimes identified as the northern part of the Sydney central business district. It is so named because the earliest churches in Australia were formed on this site, including St Patrick's (Roman Catholic), St Philip's (Anglican) and Scots Church (Presbyterian)

The significance of Church Hill dates back to the time of Governor Arthur Phillip, who mandated compulsory Sunday church attendance for all convicts, until they rebelled and burned down the area's first church in 1798.

The area gained greater prominence as Church Hill on Wednesday 1 October 1800, when incoming Governor Philip Gidley King had the foundation stone laid for St Philip's Church, which subsequently he proclaimed one of Australia's first two parishes in 1802 (the other being St John's in Parramatta).

The site where St Patrick's Church currently stands is where the Roman Catholic Eucharist was first preserved in Australia, in May 1818. Celebrations for the bicentenary of this occasion were held in St Patrick's Church on Sunday 6 May 2018.

Heritage listings 

The Rocks has a number of heritage-listed sites, including:

 Argyle Street: Argyle Cut 
 12–20 Argyle Street: Argyle Stores 
 39–43 Argyle Street: British Seamen's Hotel 
 45–47 Argyle Street: Gannon House 
 1–7 Atherden Street: Playfair's Terrace 
 2–4 Atherden Street: Avery Terrace 
 Circular Quay Concourse, Circular Quay East and West: Sydney Cove railings
 7–27 Circular Quay West: Campbell's Stores 
 Cumberland Place: Cumberland Place and Steps 
 Cumberland Street: Argyle Bridge 
 96–98 Cumberland Street: Glenmore Hotel 
 100–104 Cumberland Street: Australian Hotel 
 106–128 Cumberland Street: Cumberland Street Archaeological Site 
 130, 132–134, 136–138 and 140–142 Cumberland Street: Long's Lane Precinct 
 176 Cumberland Street: Lilyvale 
 178–180 Cumberland Street: Butchery Building 
 182 Cumberland Street: 182 Cumberland Street 
 182.5-188 Cumberland Street: 182.5-188 Cumberland Street 
 212–218 Cumberland Street: Lawson House 
 10–14 Essex Street: Harts Buildings 
 25–27 George Street: Mercantile Hotel 
 29–31 George Street: 29–31 George Street 
 33–41 George Street: Sergeant Major's Row 
 36–64 George Street: Old Mining Museum Building 
 43–45 George Street: Merchant's House 
 47 George Street: Union Bond Store 
 53–65 George Street: Harrington's Buildings 
 68–84 George Street: Metcalfe Bond Stores 
 69 George Street: Observer Hotel 
 73 George Street: Old Ambulance Station 
 75-75.5 George Street: Samson's Cottage 
 77–85 George Street: Unwin's Stores 
 86–88 George Street: Old Bushells Factory 
 87–89 George Street: Orient Hotel 
 91 George Street: ASN Hotel Building 
 93 George Street: 93 George Street, The Rocks 
 95–99 George Street: 95–99 George Street 
 98–100 George Street: Mariners' Church 
 101 George Street: 101 George Street
 102–104 George Street: Old Coroner's Court
 103 George Street: 103 George Street
 105 George Street: 105 George Street
 106–108 George Street: Sydney Sailors' Home
 107–109 George Street: 107–109 George Street
 110 George Street: Cadman's Cottage 
 111–115 George Street: Captain Tench Arcade
 112–156 George Street: Sydney Cove West Archaeological Precinct
 117–119 George Street: Julian Ashton Art School 
 121 George Street: 121 George Street
 123–125 George Street: 123–125 George Street
 127–129 George Street: Old Police Station 
 131–135 George Street: English, Scottish and Australian Bank 
 137 George Street: Fortune of War Hotel 
 139–141 George Street: 139–141 George Street 
 143-143a George Street: Russell Hotel 
 145 George Street: 145 George Street
 147 George Street: 147 George Street
 149–151 George Street: 149–151 George Street
 153–155 George Street: New York Hotel 
 229 George Street: Brooklyn Hotel 
 231 George Street: 231 George Street 
 233–235 George Street: Johnson's Building 
 26–30 Gloucester Street: View Terrace facades
 32–36 Gloucester Street: 32–36 and 38–40 Gloucester Street facades
 46–56 Gloucester Street: 46–56 Gloucester Street
 58–64 Gloucester Street: Susannah Place 
 66–68, 70–72 Gloucester Street: Baker's Terrace
 103–111 Gloucester Street: Jobbins Terrace 
 113–115 Gloucester Street: 113–115 Gloucester Street 
 117-117a Gloucester Street: 117-117a Gloucester Street 
 120 Gloucester Street: Model Factory and Dwelling 
 157–169 Gloucester Street and Essex Street: Science House 
 16–18 Grosvenor Street: NSW Housing Board Building, Grosvenor Street 
 24–30 Grosvenor Street: Federation Hall 
 32–34 Grosvenor Street: Royal Naval House 
 28–30 Harrington Street: Reynolds' Cottages 
 32 Harrington Street: 32 Harrington Street 
 34–40 Harrington Street: Evans' Stores 
 42–52 Harrington Street: 42–52 Harrington Street
 55–59 Harrington Street: 55–59 Harrington Street
 61–65 Harrington Street: 61–65 Harrington Street
 67 Harrington Street: 67 Harrington Street
 71 Harrington Street: 71 Harrington Street
 117–119 Harrington Street: Accountants House 
 121–127 Harrington Street: Bushells Building 
 Hickson Road: Dawes Point Battery remains 
 1–5 Hickson Road: ASN Co building 
 4–6 Kendall Lane: Raphael Mackeller Stores 
 8 Kendall Lane: Samson's Cottage wall remains 
 13–15 Playfair Street: Argyle Terrace 
 17–31 Playfair Street: Playfair Street Terraces 
 22–26 Playfair Street: Penrhyn House 
 33 Playfair Street: Cleland Bond Store

Population

At the 2021 census, 629 people were living in The Rocks.

Culture

The close proximity to Circular Quay and the views of the iconic Harbour Bridge, as well as the historic nature of many of the buildings, makes the Rocks very popular with tourists. It features a variety of souvenir and craft shops, as well as many themed and historic pubs. The Rocks Market operates each weekend, with around 100 stalls. During the week, shopping options include galleries exhibiting Australian artists, such as Ken Done and Ken Duncan, as well as Australian clothing and Australian opal shops. There are numerous historic walks through the area, visiting historical buildings such as Cadmans Cottage and Sydney Observatory, and the Dawes Point Battery, which was the first fortified position in New South Wales.

Two separate pubs in The Rocks claim to be Sydney's oldest surviving pubs: the Fortune of War and the Lord Nelson. Others in the area include the Observer, the Orient, the Mercantile, the Palisade and the Hero of Waterloo.

A passenger boat terminal and the Museum of Contemporary Art is also situated beside the Rocks area. The precinct can also be accessed by rail, as it is within walking distance of Circular Quay station.

Water Polo by the Sea is held there every year by Australian Water Polo with the Australia men's national water polo team take on the International All Stars.

Susannah Place Museum is a historic house museum situated in The Rocks. It is a block of four terrace houses that was built in 1844 and had domestic occupants until 1990. It is a documentation of the urban working class community in The Rocks. The terraces in various states of modernity show the evolution of occupation over 150 years

In popular culture
The Rocks, as it was in 1873, is the setting for the time-slip portion of the novel Playing Beatie Bow.

Gallery

Literature 
 Ambrose Pratt: King of the Rocks, novel. Hutchinson, London 1900
 D. Manning Richards. Destiny in Sydney: An epic novel of convicts, Aborigines, and Chinese embroiled in the birth of Sydney, Australia. First book in Sydney series. Washington DC: Aries Books, 2012. 
 Grace Karskens, The Rocks: Life in Early Sydney, Melbourne University Press, 1997.

References

External links

 The Rocks

Dictionary of Sydney entries
  [CC-By-SA]
  [CC-By-SA] 
  [CC-By-SA] 
  [CC-By-SA]

 
Rocks, Sydney
Slums in Australia
Green bans